Jack Campbell may refer to:

 Jack Campbell (author) (born 1956), pseudonym of American science fiction author John G. Hemry
 Jack M. Campbell (1916–1999), American politician
 Jackie Campbell (born 1946), Scottish footballer for Partick Thistle
 Jack Campbell (actor) (born 1970), Australian actor
 Jack Campbell (cricketer) (born 1999), English cricketer
 Jack Campbell (ice hockey) (born 1992), American ice hockey goaltender
 Jack Campbell (golfer) (1878–1955), Scottish golfer
 Jack Campbell (American football) (born 2000), American football player
 Jack Campbell (Sioux Indian), led an attack against Mankato, Minnesota Territory, see Department of the Northwest

See also
 John Campbell (disambiguation)